Andrew Olaf "Andy" "A.O." Devold (November 17, 1881 — December 12, 1939) was an American politician active in Minnesota.

Early life
Devold was born November 17, 1881 in Stockholm, Sweden. He served in the Minnesota House of Representatives from 1915 to 1918 and in the Minnesota Senate from 1919 to 1926 and again from 1931 until his death. First elected on the ticket of the Socialist Party, he played a key role in founding the Minnesota Farmer–Labor Party. He died in Minneapolis, Minnesota on December 12, 1939, age 58 years.

References

1881 births
1939 deaths
20th-century American politicians
Minnesota Farmer–Laborites
Socialist Party of America politicians from Minnesota